The Zone 2 of Milan (in Italian: Zona 2 di Milano) is one of the 9 administrative zones of Milan, Italy. In the "sunburst" geometry of the zones of Milan, Zone 2 is the slice that connects the centre to the periphery in the north-east direction.

Overview
The history and development of Zone 2 have been largely influenced by its location on important routes leading from Milan to major nearby settlements such as Monza as well as towards Venice and other main cities of the Italian North-East.

The Naviglio Martesana canal, which traverses most of Zone 2, has been a prominent transportation means in the development of the Milanese area; between the 19th and 20th century, this role has been taken on by the railway system, which again was largely based in what is now Zone 2.  The Milano Centrale railway station, the most important railway station in Milan and one of the most important railway nodes in Italy, is located in the eponymous district of Zone 2. 

Especially as a consequence of the development of the railway system, in the early 20th century the Milanese north-east quickly changed from a rural area to a mostly industrial city outskirt, experiencing, at the same time, a dramatic increase in population.  In the mid-20th century, as factories were gradually dismantled as a consequence of the expansion of the city centre, Zone 2 changed again, this time into a mostly residential and tertiary area.  The recent evolution of Zone 2 is also strongly influenced by the high concentration of extra-European immigrants, the highest in Milan, which has led to the development of distinctively multi-ethnic neighbourhoods such as that of Viale Padova (in the Loreto district).

The complex history of Zone 2 is witnessed by its diverse landscape, which includes such contrasting elements as modern skyscraper-punctuated districts, old-fashioned popular Milanese neighbourhoods, luxury villas on the banks of the Naviglio Martesana, restored "cascine" (country houses), abandoned factories, and modern high-income residential areas.

Subdivision
The main quartieri (districts) of Zone 2 are Adriano, Crescenzago, Gorla, Greco, Loreto, Maggiolina (also known as Villaggio dei Giornalisti), Mandello, Mirabello, Ponte Seveso, Porta Nuova, Precotto, Stazione Centrale, Nolo and Turro. 

Many of these districts were independent comuni up until the first decades of the 20th century, before being annexed to Milan. This is reflected, amongst other things, in the fact that many of them are evidently structured as small towns rather than as typical metropolitan areas.

Notable places
 Corso Buenos Aires, major shopping street
 Milano Centrale railway station, Milan's most important railway station
 Naviglio Martesana, canal connecting Milan to the river Adda

References

External links

 Zone 2 of Milan (municipal website)

Zones of Milan